The following are lists of affiliates of the CBS television network:

List of CBS television affiliates (by U.S. state)
List of CBS television affiliates (table)
List of former CBS television affiliates

See also
Lists of ABC television affiliates
Lists of Fox television affiliates
Lists of NBC television affiliates